The XXXXVII Grand Prix de France Henri Deglane 2021 (also known as Grand Prix of France 2021 and Henri Deglane Grand Prix 2021) was a wrestling event held in Nice, France between 15 and 17 January 2021. It was held in the memory of 1924 Olympic Gold medalist Henri Deglane.

Medal overview

Medal table

Team ranking

Men's freestyle 
January 16

Men's Greco-Roman 
January 17

Women's freestyle 
January 15

Participating nations 
249 competitors from 26 nations participated.

References 

2021 in sport wrestling
2021 in French sport
International wrestling competitions hosted by France
Sport in France
Sport in Nice
January 2021 sports events in France